Hunters Quay is a village, on the Cowal peninsula in Argyll and Bute, Scottish Highlands. Situated between Kirn to the south and Ardnadam to the north, Hunters Quay is the main base of Western Ferries, operating between Hunters Quay and McInroy's Point.

Structures

Esplanade
Hunters Quay's esplanade was built in 1880, protected by a breast wall, along the north shore of Balgay Bay at a cost of £500.

Victoria Bridge
Spanning Balgay Bay, Victoria Bridge was built in 1878.

Royal Marine Hotel

The current building was built in 1890.  This and the previous building was, between 1872 and the 1950s, the home of the Royal Clyde Yacht Club, which was founded in 1856.

Hafton House

Built in 1815 for James Hunter.

Villas
In the mid 19th century, the principal villas at Hunters Quay were Claver House (Mr Miller), Linnwood (Mr Somerville), Rock Hill (Capt. Littlejohn), Whinhill (Mrs Ross), Woodside (Mr Bell) and Craigend (Mr Bryson).

1908 Summer Olympic Games

The 12-metre class yacht race in the 1908 London Olympic Games took place at Hunters Quay. Most of the sailing took place on the Solent, but only two boats entered the 12-metre class: Mouchette from the Royal Liverpool Yacht Club and Hera from the Royal Clyde Yacht Club. They were allowed to race on the Clyde for convenience. The course was twice round a  lap of the Clyde, starting and finishing at Hunters Quay. Thomas C. Glen-Coats' Hera won.

Jim Crow Rock – Puffin Rock

"Jim Crow" (earlier "The Jim Crow"), a pointed glacial erratic rock lying horizontally on the beach,  was known as the "Jim Crow Stone" by 1864, and by 1904 was painted with a face. There have been various suggestions for the inspiration behind the name and design: the Jim Crow character featured in Jump Jim Crow, a song and dance popularised in 1832 by the American minstrel show performer Thomas D. Rice; local stories suggest it could have been the name of the owner of a nearby builders’/joiners yard; a jackdaw [which has a black beak but not a red mouth]; or the later Jim Crow laws which were state and local laws enforcing racial segregation in the Southern United States. Another suggestion is that it was named after the line "So they canonized him by the name of Jim Crow!"  in the 1837 poem The Jackdaw of Rheims.

Due to concerns about racism the rock was painted over a number of times, but repeatedly returned to its original state. In 2017 Neville Lawrence, father of Stephen Lawrence, saw the rock when he was on holiday in the area, and described it as saddening and disappointing, an uncomfortable reminder of division. It later attracted Black Lives Matter protests, and was painted black. In community efforts to find a way forward, a competition was held for young people to propose a unifying design. The winning design was by a Dunoon Grammar School pupil, who with other pupils re-painted the rock in 2021 as a puffin.

Gallery

References

Villages in Cowal
Ports and harbours of Scotland
Olympic sailing venues
Venues of the 1908 Summer Olympics
Firth of Clyde
Highlands and Islands of Scotland
Glacial erratics of Great Britain